The All-Japan University Rugby Football Championships (全国大学ラグビーフットボール選手権大会 – Zenkoku Daigaku Ragubi- Futtobo-ru Senshuken Taikai) have been held annually since 1964 to determine the top University Rugby team.

In 1964 only 4 teams competed. From 1965 to 1992 there were 8 teams and finally expanding to 16 teams from 1993 onwards.

Qualifying 

1964

 Kanto Taiko League – Top 2 teams
 Kansai League – Top 2 teams

1965–1992

 Kanto Taiko League and Kanto League – Top 4 teams
 Kansai League – Top 2 teams
 Kyushuu League – Winner

Then there is a 3rd place in the Kansai League which is decided in a playoff between the 3rd place Kansai League team and the top Tokai League team.

1993–present

 Kanto Taiko League – Top 4 finishers
 Kanto League – Top 5 finishers
 Kansai League – Top 4 finishers
 Kyushuu League – Winner

Then there is a 5th place in the Kanto Taiko League and the Kansai League which is decided in playoffs of the 5th placed team in the league and winners of other regional university leagues.

Finalists 

In 1968 （Keio vs Waseda）、1985 （Keio vs Meiji） and 1988 （Daito Bunka University vs Meiji） the finals ended in a draw and the title was shared.

All Japan University Rugby Championships Finals

See also

Universities:
 Waseda University
 Meiji University
 Kanto Gakuin University
 Doshisha University
 Hosei University
 Keio University
 Daito Bunka University
 Nippon Sport Science University
 Teikyo University
 Tokai University
 Rugby Union in Japan

References

External links
  – Waseda University Rugby Club Website (Japanese)
  – Meiji University Rugby Club Website (Japanese)
  – Kanto Gakuin University Rugby Club Website (Japanese)
  – Doshisha University Rugby Club Website (Japanese)
  – Hosei University Rugby Club Website (Japanese)
  – Keio University Rugby Club Website (Japanese)
  – Daito Bunka University Rugby Club Website (Japanese)
  – Nippon Sport Science University Rugby Club Website (Japanese)
  – Teikyo University Rugby Club Website (Japanese)
  – Tokai University Rugby Club Website (Japanese)
  Japanese Rugby, official page
  Japanese Rugby, official score archive
  Japan Rugby Football Union (JRFU) official page (Old Site)
  Japan Rugby Football Union (JRFU) official page (New Site)

 
Student sport in Japan
Rugby union competitions in Japan
Recurring sporting events established in 1964
1964 establishments in Japan
Japan